Shakirullah Khan Durrani (also known as "Shakir K. Durrani.", and also transliterated as "Shakir'ullah"; ; 3 March 1928 – 20 November 2009) was a Pakistani banker who served as the managing director of Pakistan International Airlines and Governor of the State Bank of Pakistan. His daughter Tehmina Durrani is a wife of former chief minister of Punjab and current Prime Minister of Pakistan, Shehbaz Sharif.

Banking career 
After leaving military service, Durrani started a career in banking. After some years in England, Durrani returned home to be appointed Deputy Managing Director of Pakistan Industrial Credit and Investment Corporation (PICIC) in 1962.

In February 1966, the Pakistani government established the Investment Corporation of Pakistan (ICP), a government-owned mutual fund with the objective of enlarging the investor base and developing the capital markets in Pakistan, and Durrani was appointed its first managing director.

In September 1969, the Pakistani government nationalized Pakistan International Airlines and appointed Durrani as its new managing director.

In July 1971, he was appointed Governor of the State Bank of Pakistan but when the Pakistani military government lost a disastrous war against India in December, SU Durrani's meteoric rise was over.  When Zulfiqar Ali Bhutto became president and Chief Martial Law Administrator of Pakistan in December 1971, Durrani was put under house arrest and later sent to prison. No charges were brought against Durrani.

After his release from prison, Durrani resumed his banking career. In the 1970s, Bankers Equity Limited (BEL) arranged a joint venture between him and a large Japanese leasing company --- Orient Leasing (later ORIX), one of largest commercial aircraft lessors.  BEL took 25% of the equity; the Japanese took 40%; Durrani's business partner took 4% with Durrani taking the rest (31%). SU Durrani was appointed Chairman of the Orient Leasing Pakistan Limited (OLP) with Humayun Murad as General Manager and his nominee. The Japanese managed the company till 1990, when the company went public. The Japanese directors took up assignments in Europe with the 43-year-old Humayun Murad appointed as Managing Director and Durrani remained as Vice Chairman.

Durrani later took on a number of projects in his home district, Charsadda, aimed at helping Pashtuns and Pakistanis, including job creation and funding humanitarian projects, development and charities.  These projects included a fructose factory and Frontier Ceramics.

See also
Tehmina Durrani
List of Pashtuns

References

Pashtun people
20th-century Pakistani businesspeople
Pakistani philanthropists
Pakistani humanitarians
People from Charsadda District, Pakistan
Governors of the State Bank of Pakistan
Pakistani airline chief executives
Pakistan International Airlines people
1928 births
2009 deaths
Pakistan Army officers
20th-century philanthropists
Hayat Khattar family
Pakistani prisoners and detainees
Government College University, Lahore alumni